The Vashon Glaciation, Vashon Stadial or Vashon Stade is a local term for the most recent period of very cold climate in which during its peak, glaciers covered the entire Salish Sea as well as present day Seattle, Tacoma, Olympia and other surrounding areas in the western part of present-day Washington (state) of the United States of America. This occurred during a cold period around the world known as the last glacial period.  This was the most recent cold period of the Quaternary glaciation, the time period in which the arctic ice sheets have existed.  The Quaternary Glaciation is part of the Late Cenozoic Ice Age, which began 33.9 million years ago and is ongoing.  It is the time period in which the Antarctic ice cap has existed.

The Vashon Glaciation lasted from about 19,000 – 16,000 BP (Before Present – present defined as January 1, 1950 for this scale).  The Cordilleran Ice Sheet was an ice sheet that covered present-day southern Alaska and parts of western Canada. The Fraser Glaciation began when the Cordilleran Ice Sheet advanced out of the mountains of British Columbia following the Fraser River and Fraser Valley.  The Vashon Glaciation is an extension of the Fraser Glaciation in which the Cordilleran Ice Sheet advanced south of the present day Canada–United States border into the Puget Sound region.  By following the Fraser Valley, the ice reached the Puget Sound Region using the same pathway that cold arctic air takes during a present-day winter cold snap.

The Cordilleran, Laurentide, Innuitian, and the currently existing Greenland Ice Sheet all made up the North American ice sheet complex, which covered present day Canada and much of the northern U.S. This cold glaciated time for North America was called the Wisconsin glaciation.

Climate (20,000 to 16,000 BP)

During the Vashon glaciation, the climate in Western Washington, like most places, was much colder than today.  As well as being cold, it was also much drier than in current times, which was characteristic of some places, and opposite of others.

Pollen data collected from Battleground Lake in southwest Washington (state) shows that from 20,000 – 16,000 BP, annual temperatures in the area were about 6 ± 1 °C (10.8 ± 1.8 °F) colder than in present times (present times as of 1990), and precipitation was around 1 meter (39.4 inches) less.  The Battle Ground area averaged 52.14 inches (132.44 cm) of precipitation per year for the period of 1961–1990.  A meter less precipitation means that during period of 20,000 – 16,000 BP, the average precipitation would have only been around 24.5% of what it was in the near present 1961–1990 period.

The Laurentide Ice Sheet had a major effect on the climate.  It was an ice sheet covering much of Canada, and parts of the northern United States in the Midwest and east.  The Rocky Mountains separated the Laurentide Ice Sheet from the Cordilleran Ice Sheet.  The Laurentide Ice Sheet had a cooling effect on the middle latitudes.  This caused the jet stream over North America to split in two.  The southern branch was pushed further south than it is in present times meaning that the storm tracks were missing the Pacific Northwest most of the time.  Because of this, Southern and Central California had wetter climates than in present times.

Average annual temperatures in the lowlands of Western Washington were above 0 °C (32 °F).  This means that there was more summer thawing than there was winter freezing.  This would seem to be a climate too warm to support glaciers, but the ice was pushing in from the north faster than it could melt.

The advance (19,000 to 16,950 BP)

The advance of the Cordilleran Ice Sheet actually began long before 19,000 years ago. However, 19,000 years ago marks the approximate time when glaciers crossed the present-day Canada–United States border into Western Washington, which is generally considered to be the beginning of the Vashon Glaciation. This southern part of the Cordilleran Ice Sheet is called the Puget Lobe. The Vashon Glaciation actually began after the planet's Last Glacial Maximum. Glaciers were retreating throughout most of the world, but growing in Western Washington. Around 18,350 BP, the Puget Lobe blocked the Puget Sound from reaching the Strait of Juan de Fuca, turning the Puget Sound into Glacial Lake Russell. By around 17,950 BP, the glacier reached present-day Seattle. By around 17,650 BP, the Puget Lobe reached present-day Tacoma. By around 17,350 BP, the glacier reached present-day Olympia. The Puget Lobe reached its maximum extent in the vicinity of the present-day city of Tenino around 16,950 BP.

The maximum extent (16,950 to 16,850 BP)

The Puget Lobe remained at its maximum extent in the vicinity of present-day Tenino from around 16,950 BP to around 16,850 BP, a total of about 100 years.

The retreat (16,850 to 16,000 BP)

Around 16,850 BP, the Puget Lobe began retreating northward at a rate of about 340 meters (1,120 feet) per year.  By about 16,650 BP, the glacier only came down to present-day Olympia.  The Puget Lobe began to uncover Glacial Lake Russell.  By 16,450 BP, the Puget Lobe only came down to Tacoma.  By 16,150 BP, the glacier only came down to Seattle.  By about 16,000 BP, the Puget Lobe retreated far enough north that Glacial Lake Russell and the Strait of Juan de Fuca became connected, making Glacial Lake Russell the salt water body of Puget Sound again.

Formation of Kettles and Kettle Lakes

For areas on land, as the Puget Lobe receded, blocks of ice broke off and became separate.  The melting glacier produced streams which carried sediment.  The bottom of the ice blocks became buried in sediment.  As the blocks of ice melted, it left depressions in the ground called kettles.  Some of these kettles filled up with water to become kettle lakes and kettle ponds.  (see Kettle (landform))

Glacial Lake Carbon – Catastrophic Glacial Outburst Flood

Glacial Lake Carbon was a lake created by the Puget Lobe damming the Carbon River. Around 16,850 BP when the glacier began retreating, the ice dam holding back the lake became breached causing a major glacial outburst flood.  The flood covered present day central and northern Thurston County, part of Pierce County, and small parts of Lewis and Grays Harbor Counties.

Life during the Vashon Glaciation

Post Vashon Times (16,000 BP to present)

Pollen data collected from Battleground Lake shows that between 16,000 and 15,000 BP, temperatures were around 4 ± 2 °C (7.2 ± 3.6 °F) colder than present (present as of 1990).  The amount of precipitation was similar to that of the present.

From about 14,000 to 12,000 BP, the area got more Pinus contorta (lodgepole pine), but was still an open area.  Currently, the earliest human beings known to be in Western Washington were there in 13,800 BP.  A mastodon kill site from that time period was excavated in Sequim in 1977.

From 12,000 BP to 10,000 BP, the area got a bigger variety of trees, and became a closed forest.  The vegetation was similar to today with Alnus rubra (red alder), Picea sitchensis (sitka spruce), Pinus contorta (lodgepole pine), Pseudotsuga (Douglas fir), and Tsuga heterophylla (Western hemlock).

The official end of the Pleistocene Epoch and the beginning of the Holocene Epoch occurred in 11,700 BP.

Between 9,500 and 4,500 BP during the Holocene climatic optimum, temperatures in the area were around 2 ± 1 °C (3.6 ± 1.8 °F) warmer than present with 45 ± 5% less precipitation.  Between 9,500 and 5,000 BP, there was Alnus (alder), Pseudotsuga (Douglas fir), Pteridium (bracken fern), and high amounts of Chrysolepis (chinkapin) and Quercus (oak trees).

Sequence of lakes

References

External links
  Detailed Map of Vashon Glaciation - Washington State Department of Natural Resources

Geology of Washington (state)
Ice ages
Natural history of Washington (state)
Glaciology of the United States